Yansab is a SABIC, affiliate company in Saudi Arabia, and is the largest SABIC petrochemical complex.  It will has an annual capacity exceeding 4 million metric tons (MT) of petrochemical products including: 1.3 million MT (metric-tons) of ethylene; 400,000 MT of propylene; 900,000 MT of polyethylene; 400,000 MT of polypropylene; 700,000 MT of ethylene glycol; 250,000 MT of benzene, xylene and toluene, and 100,000 MT of butene-1 and butene-2.

Yansab is expected to employ 1,500 people in phase I and phase II.

SABIC owns 55% of YANSAB capital. SABIC affiliates Ibn Rushd and Tayef hold 10% of Yansab capital.  35% of Yansab is public stocks.

Fluor Arabia is the main U&O contractor on the Yansab project.

References

External links
 Yansab

2006 establishments in Saudi Arabia
Chemical companies established in 2006
Companies listed on Tadawul
Companies of Saudi Arabia
SABIC